Thiago Monteiro was the defending champion but chose not to defend his title.

Daniel Elahi Galán won the title after defeating Thiago Agustín Tirante 6–1, 3–6, 6–3 in the final.

Seeds

Draw

Finals

Top half

Bottom half

References

External links
Main draw
Qualifying draw

Lima Challenger - Singles
2020 Singles